Elvis (also known as Elvis – Good Rockin' Tonight)  is an American drama series about the early life of Elvis Presley that aired on ABC from February 6 until May 19, 1990 before its cancellation due to the high cost of each episode. These ten episodes, along with three unaired episodes, were edited into a four-hour mini-series titled Elvis: The Early Years. The series starred Michael St. Gerard as Presley, Jesse Dabson, Blake Gibbons, Millie Perkins, and Billy "Green" Bush. Elvis voice-impersonator Ronnie McDowell provided the singing voice for St. Gerard on the series.

Plot
Elvis: Good Rockin' Tonight was a series offering a dramatic re-creation of Presley's time just before becoming a major star, focusing on him in 1954 and 1955 as he was beginning his recording career at Sun Records.

Production
Michael St. Gerard had played Presley twice before, in the 1989 films Great Balls of Fire! and Heart of Dixie; and once again after this series, in a 1993 episode of Quantum Leap.

Millie Perkins starred as the real Elvis's love interest in the 1961 film, Wild in the Country. Here she plays his mother.

Matt Dillon and Scott Valentine were the first two choices for the role of Presley.

St. Gerard's audition was a line read, and him lip syncing to "Baby, Let's Play House". He was flown to Memphis the next day to start filming. The brown-eyed St. Gerard refused to wear blue contacts for the role.

Cast
 Michael St. Gerard as Elvis Presley
 Millie Perkins as Gladys Presley
 Billy Green Bush as Vernon Presley
 Jesse Dabson as Scotty Moore
 Blake Gibbons as Bill Black
 Kelli Williams as Mattie Walker
 Jordan Williams as Sam Phillips
 Howard French as Harley “Red” Calder

Episodes

Reception
The show struggled with low ratings and mediocre reviews.

References

External links

1990 American television series debuts
1990 American television series endings
1990s American drama television series
American biographical series
American Broadcasting Company original programming
Rockabilly
Works about Elvis Presley
Cultural depictions of Elvis Presley
Television series by New World Television
Television series set in 1954
Television series set in 1955
Television shows set in Nevada